Stanislav Gron (born October 28, 1978) is a Slovak professional ice hockey left winger. He is currently playing a free agent having last played for HC Bratislava in the Slovak 1. Liga. He was drafted by the New Jersey Devils in the second round, 38th overall, of the 1997 NHL Entry Draft. He played one game in the National Hockey League with the Devils during the 2000–01 season against the Carolina Hurricanes on February 23, 2001, being held without a point. In the game, he played 9:55 of ice time and was +1, taking 2 shots on goal.

After the 2001–02 season, he returned to Europe. He played for HC Vítkovice in the Czech league and later won the Slovak title with MsHK Žilina in the Slovak Extraliga in 2006 and with HC Košice in 2009 and 2010.

On 4 May 2009, Kosice announced that Gron, along with teammate Jaroslav Kmiť, had each signed new 3 year contracts to play in Kosice.

After playing with Kosice, he was signed by the Manchester Phoenix in July 2015.

International play 
Gron participated at the 2010 IIHF World Championship, playing 3 games for Slovakia.

Career statistics

See also
List of players who played only one game in the NHL

References

External links

1978 births
Albany River Rats players
Füchse Duisburg players
HC Košice players
HC Slavia Praha players
HC Slovan Bratislava players
HC Vítkovice players
Kootenay Ice players
Living people
Manchester Phoenix players
MsHK Žilina players
New Jersey Devils draft picks
New Jersey Devils players
Seattle Thunderbirds players
SG Cortina players
Slovak ice hockey right wingers
Ice hockey people from Bratislava
Utah Grizzlies (IHL) players